Duncan MacGillivray (born 25 October 1976) is a former Scotland international rugby league footballer who played as a  or  in the 1990s and 2000s. He played at club level for the Penrith Panthers and the South Sydney Rabbitohs in the NRL, and the Wakefield Trinity Wildcats in the Super League, and at international level for Scotland.

Background
He was born in Darwin, Northern Territory, Australia.

MacGillivray is a Nightcliff Dragons junior playing in the Darwin Rugby League competition.

Playing career
He went on to making his name in the NRL spending five years with the Penrith Panthers, and playing for South Sydney Rabbitohs.

The former Scotland international had an excellent season with the Wildcats in 2006 and his form carried on into the following years. He retired at the end of the 2008 season after 5-seasons of service to the Wildcats.

References

External links
Souths Profile
Statistics at stats.rleague.com

1976 births
Living people
Australian people of Scottish descent
Australian rugby league players
Penrith Panthers players
Rugby league players from Darwin, Northern Territory
Rugby league props
Rugby league second-rows
Scotland national rugby league team players
South Sydney Rabbitohs players
Wakefield Trinity players